Kaisha or gaisha may refer to:

Arts and entertainment 
 Kaisha (The Sopranos), an episode of The Sopranos

Japanese corporate law 
  or gaisha, the Japanese word for "corporation"
 Kabushiki gaisha, a type of joint-stock company
 Gōdō gaisha, a type of limited liability company
 Gōmei gaisha, a type of unlimited partnership company
 Gōshi gaisha, a type of unlimited liability company
 Yūgen gaisha, a historic kind of limited liability company

See also 
 Law of Japan#Corporate law